In enzymology, a 2'-hydroxybiphenyl-2-sulfinate desulfinase is an enzyme that catalyzes the chemical reaction

2'-hydroxybiphenyl-2-sulfinate + H2O  2-hydroxybiphenyl + sulfite

Thus, the two substrates of this enzyme are 2'-hydroxybiphenyl-2-sulfinate and H2O, whereas its two products are 2-hydroxybiphenyl and sulfite.

This enzyme belongs to the family of hydrolases, specifically those acting on carbon-sulfur bonds. The systematic name of this enzyme class is 2'-hydroxybiphenyl-2-sulfinate sulfohydrolase. Other names in common use include gene dszB-encoded hydrolase, 2-(2-hydroxyphenyl) benzenesulfinate:H2O hydrolase, DszB, HBPSi desulfinase, 2-(2-hydroxyphenyl) benzenesulfinate sulfohydrolase, HPBS desulfinase, 2-(2-hydroxyphenyl)benzenesulfinate hydrolase, 2-(2'-hydroxyphenyl)benzenesulfinate desulfinase, and 2-(2-hydroxyphenyl)benzenesulfinate desulfinase.

Structural studies

References 

 
 
 

EC 3.13.1
Enzymes of known structure